Sir Nicholas Colston Lockyer  ISO (6 October 1855 – 26 August 1933) was a senior Australian public servant, best known for his time as head of the Department of Trade and Customs.

Life and career
Lockyer was born in Woolloomooloo, Sydney on 6 October 1855. His first marriage was to Mary Juliet, daughter of Geoffrey Eagar, from 1885 to her death in 1898. In 1901, he married Winifred, the daughter of Harry Wollaston.

Between 1911 and 1913, Lockyer was Comptroller-General of Customs and head of the Department of Trade and Customs.

Lockyer died at his home in Toorak, Melbourne, on 26 August 1933.

Awards
Lockyer was awarded an Imperial Service Order in July 1906 whilst Collector of Customs for New South Wales. He was created a Commander of the Order of the British Empire in October 1918, and made a Knight Bachelor in January 1926.

References

1855 births
1933 deaths
Australian Commanders of the Order of the British Empire
Australian Knights Bachelor
Australian Companions of the Imperial Service Order
20th-century Australian public servants